Jean-François Batut (26 June 1828 in Castres - 21 May 1907) was a French painter known for his portraits, with subjects including Ferdinand de Lesseps and Gustave Eiffel. His son Léopold (born 1856) was also a painter.

References

1828 births
1907 deaths
People from Castres
19th-century French painters
19th-century French male artists
French male painters
20th-century French painters
20th-century French male artists
French portrait painters